Eckart Peter Hans von Klaeden (born 18 November 1965 in Hanover) is a German politician of the Christian Democratic Union (CDU) who served as Minister of State at the German Chancellery from 2009 to 2013.

Education and early career
Eckart von Klaeden took his Abitur at the Emperor William Gymnasium in Hanover in 1985, served his military service from 1985 to 1987 and became a Korvettenkapitän (corvette captain) of the Reserves. He went on to study law at the universities of Würzburg and Göttingen, taking his first state exam in 1993 and his second in 1996.

Political career
Von Klaeden became a member of the Junge Union in 1983. Between 1992 and 1996, he served on the board of the CDU in Lower Saxony, under the leadership of successive chairmen Josef Stock (1992–94) and Christian Wulff (1994-96).

Von Klaeden served as member of the German parliament, the Bundestag, between 1994 and 2013. He was a member of the Committee on Legal Affairs (1994-1998) and of the Committee on the Scrutiny of Elections, Immunity and the Rules of Procedure (2002-2005). Between 2000 and 2005, he also served as First Secretary of the parliamentary group, in this position assisting the parliamentary group's successive chairmen Friedrich Merz (2000-2002) and Angela Merkel (2002-2005). From 2005, he was his parliamentary group's spokesman for foreign policy. In addition to his committee assignments, von Klaeden served as chairman of the German-Hungarian Parliamentary Friendship Group from 2002 until 2005.

Since 2004, von Klaeden has been a member of the national board of the CDU under the leadership of chairwoman Angela Merkel. In this capacity, he was the party's treasurer from 2006 until 2013.

In 2007, 2008 and 2009, von Klaeden participated at the Bilderberg Conference.

Life after politics
On 27 May 2013, von Klaeden informed the public that he would not run again for a seat in the Deutscher Bundestag in the 2013 German federal election and that he would start a job at the Daimler AG, Stuttgart (Manager "Global External Affairs und Public Policy" - quasi 'chief lobbyist') at the end of 2013. His abrupt switch to the company prompted an investigation by Berlin prosecutors and new rules on "cooling off" periods.

Other activities
 Agora Verkehrswende, Member of the Council
 Center for European Policy Analysis (CEPA), Member of the International Leadership Council (since 2022)
 Aspen Institute Deutschland, Chairman of the Board of Trustees
 European Council on Foreign Relations (ECFR), Member
 German Committee on Eastern European Economic Relations, Member of the Presidium 
 German Council on Foreign Relations (DGAP), Member of the Steering Committee
 Konrad Adenauer Foundation, Member
 Middle East Peace Forum (NAFFO), Member of the Board of Trustees 
 Atlantik-Brücke, Member
 Amnesty International, Member
 Society for Threatened Peoples (GfbV), Member
 Federal Agency for Civic Education (BPB), Deputy Chairman of the Board of Trustees (1998-2002)

Personal life
Von Klaeden is Protestant and a member of the presidium of the Deutscher Evangelischer Kirchentag, a Protestant organisation. He is married and has three daughters.

References

External links

Bundestag biography

1965 births
Living people
Politicians from Hanover
German Protestants
Members of the Bundestag for Lower Saxony
University of Würzburg alumni
University of Göttingen alumni
Members of the Bundestag 2009–2013
Members of the Bundestag 2005–2009
Members of the Bundestag 2002–2005
Members of the Bundestag 1998–2002
Members of the Bundestag 1994–1998
Members of the Bundestag for the Christian Democratic Union of Germany